Dashtak-e Olya (also Romanized as Dashtak-e ‘Olyā) is a village in Rostam-e Yek Rural District, in the Central District of Rostam County, Fars Province, Iran. At the 2006 census, its population was 590, in 123 families.

References 

Populated places in Rostam County